The Kokobididji were an indigenous Australian people of the state of Queensland.

Country
Norman Tindale's estimation gives the Kokobididji 500 sq. miles of territory, from the headwaters of east Normanby River to those of the Daintree River in the south.

Alternative names
 Kokobididyi.
 Kokobidinji.
 Gugu-bidinji.
 Koko Piddaji.

Notes

Citations

Sources

Aboriginal peoples of Queensland
Far North Queensland